In algebra, more specifically in algebraic K-theory, the suspension  of a ring R is given by  where  is the ring of all infinite matrices with coefficients in R having only finitely many nonzero elements in each row or column and  is its ideal of matrices having only finitely many nonzero elements. It is an analog of suspension in topology.

One then has: .

References 

 C. Weibel "The K-book: An introduction to algebraic K-theory"

Algebra